Encryption software is software that uses cryptography to prevent unauthorized access to digital information. Cryptography is used to protect digital information on computers as well as the digital information that is sent to other computers over the Internet.

Classification
There are many software products which provide encryption. Software encryption uses a cipher to obscure the content into ciphertext. One way to classify this type of software is the type of cipher used. Ciphers can be divided into two categories: public key ciphers (also known as asymmetric ciphers), and symmetric key ciphers. Encryption software can be based on either public key or symmetric key encryption.

Another way to classify software encryption is to categorize its purpose. Using this approach, software encryption may be classified into software which encrypts "data in transit" and software which encrypts "data at rest". Data in transit generally uses public key ciphers, and data at rest generally uses symmetric key ciphers.

Symmetric key ciphers can be further divided into stream ciphers and block ciphers. Stream ciphers typically encrypt plaintext a bit or byte at a time, and are most commonly used to encrypt real-time communications, such as audio and video information. The key is used to establish the initial state of a keystream generator, and the output of that generator is used to encrypt the plaintext.  Block cipher algorithms split the plaintext into fixed-size blocks and encrypt one block at a time. For example, AES processes 16-byte blocks, while its predecessor DES encrypted blocks of eight bytes.

There is also a well-known case where PKI is used for data in transit of data at rest.

Data in transit

Data in transit is data that is being sent over a computer network. When the data is between two endpoints, any confidential information may be vulnerable. The payload (confidential information) can be encrypted to secure its confidentiality, as well as its integrity and validity.

Often, the data in transit is between two entities that do not know each other - such as in the case of visiting a website. As establishing a relationship and securely sharing an encryption key to secure the information that will be exchanged, a set of roles, policies, and procedures to accomplish this has been developed; it is known as the public key infrastructure, or PKI.  Once PKI has established a secure connection, a symmetric key can be shared between endpoints. A symmetric key is preferred to over the private and public keys as a symmetric cipher is much more efficient (uses less CPU cycles) than an asymmetric cipher. There are several methods for encrypting data in transit, such as IPsec, SCP, SFTP, SSH, OpenPGP and HTTPS.

Data at rest

Data at rest refers to data that has been saved to persistent storage. Data at rest is generally encrypted by a symmetric key.

Encryption may be applied at different layers in the storage stack. For example, encryption can be configured at the disk layer, on a subset of a disk called a partition, on a volume, which is a combination of disks or partitions, at the layer of a file system, or within user space applications such as database or other applications that run on the host operating system.

With full disk encryption, the entire disk is encrypted (except for the bits necessary to boot or access the disk when not using an unencrypted boot/preboot partition). As disks can be partitioned into multiple partitions, partition encryption can be used to encrypt individual disk partitions. Volumes, created by combining two or more partitions, can be encrypted using volume encryption. File systems, also composed of one or more partitions, can be encrypted using filesystem-level encryption. Directories are referred to as encrypted when the files within the directory are encrypted. File encryption encrypts a single file. Database encryption acts on the data to be stored, accepting unencrypted information and writing that information to persistent storage only after it has encrypted the data.  Device-level encryption, a somewhat vague term that includes encryption-capable tape drives, can be used to offload the encryption tasks from the CPU.

Transit of data at rest

When there is a need to securely transmit data at rest, without the ability to create a secure connection, user space tools have been developed that support this need. These tools rely upon the receiver publishing their public key, and the sender being able to obtain that public key. The sender is then able to create a symmetric key to encrypt the information, and then use the receiver's public key to securely protect the transmission of the information and the symmetric key. This allows secure transmission of information from one party to another.

Performance
The performance of encryption software is measured relative to the speed of the CPU. Thus, cycles per byte (sometimes abbreviated cpb), a unit indicating the number of clock cycles a microprocessor will need per byte of data processed, is the usual unit of measurement. Cycles per byte serve as a partial indicator of real-world performance in cryptographic functions. Applications may offer their own encryption called native encryption, including databases applications such as Microsoft SQL, Oracle, and MongoDB, and commonly rely on direct usage of CPU cycles for performance. This often impacts the desirability of encryption in businesses seeking greater security and ease of satisfying compliance by impacting the speed and scale of how data within organizations through to their partners.

See also

 Cryptographic Protocol
 Public Key (Asymmetric) Algorithms
 Symmetric Algorithms
 Transport Layer Security
 Comparison of disk encryption software
 Defense strategy (computing)
 Ransomware: Malicious software using encryption

References

External links